This article presents a list of Japanese regions by Human Development Index as of 2021. This article also includes a list of Japanese prefectures by historical HDI in 1990, 1995 and 2000 further below.

Japanese regions by HDI (2021) 
This is a list regions of Japan by Human Development Index as of 2023, using data from the year 2021, calculated using the new methodology.

Japanese prefectures by past HDI using old methodology 
This is a list of Japanese prefectures by Human Development Index calculated using the old methodology. This data was taken from the 2007 paper "Gross National Happiness and Material Welfare in Bhutan and Japan" (Tashi Choden, Takayoshi Kusago, Kokoro Shirai, Centre for Bhutan Studies, Osaka University).

References

 Gross National Happiness and Material Welfare in Bhutan and Japan

 Human Development Index
Prefectures by Human Development Index
Prefectures by Human Development Index
Japan, Human Development Index
Human Development Index
 Human Development Index